At the End of the Night is a 2003 Italian drama film directed by Salvatore Piscicelli.

Cast 

Ennio Fantastichini: Bruno
Ida Di Benedetto: Aunt Celeste
Stefania Orsola Garello: Fiamma
Anna Ammirati: Bruno's lover
Roberto Herlitzka: Analyst
Elena Sofia Ricci  
Ricky Tognazzi

References

External links

2003 films
Italian drama films
Films directed by Salvatore Piscicelli
Films scored by Eugenio Colombo
2003 drama films
2000s Italian films